Tegner can refer to:

People 
 Esaias Tegnér, Swedish writer
 Rudolph Tegner, Danish sculptor
 Torsten Tegnér, Swedish athlete and journalist

Places 
 Tegner Township, Minnesota

See also
 Tegnér